Fountains Hall is a country house near Ripon in North Yorkshire, England, located within the World Heritage Site at Studley Royal Park which include the ruins of Fountains Abbey. It belongs to the National Trust and is a Grade I listed building.

History 

The house was built by Stephen Proctor between 1598 and 1604, partly with stone from the abbey ruins. It is an example of a late Elizabethan prodigy house, perhaps influenced by the work of Robert Smythson. After Proctor's death in 1619, Fountains Hall passed into the possession of the Messenger family, who sold it to William Aislabie of neighbouring Studley Royal 150 years later. Fountains Hall became redundant as the Aislabie family remained at Studley Royal. It was leased to tenants and at one time parts of it were used for farm storage.

The hall was renovated and modernised between 1928 and 1931, and the Duke and Duchess of York (later King George VI and Queen Elizabeth) often stayed there as guests of Lady Doris Vyner, sister to the then-current Duke of Richmond and Gordon.

During the Second World War, Fountains Hall and other estate buildings were used to house evacuees. Studley Royal became the wartime home of Queen Ethelburga's School from Harrogate and the school's sanatorium was at Fountains Hall.  The stable block and courtyard was used for dormitories while one corner became the school chapel, at which Sunday Evensong was regularly said by the Archdeacon of Ripon. The hall has a balcony although it cannot be used because the staircase is considered unsafe for the public.

Vyner memorial 

The Vyners lost a son and a daughter in the Second World War; Charles was a Royal Naval Reserve pilot missing in action near Rangoon. Elizabeth was a member of the Women's Royal Naval Service and died of lethargic encephalitis while on service in Felixstowe, Suffolk. There is a sculpture remembering them which can be seen as one comes out of the house down the stone steps. Its text, which begins with an epitaph written by John Maxwell Edmonds, reads:

After the war the hall again fell into a state of dilapidation.

The National Trust acquired the Fountains Estate from North Yorkshire County Council in 1983 and has restored the hall. Part of it has been divided into flats, one of which is a holiday let. Visitors to Fountains Abbey can view the oak-panelled stone hall and an adjoining exhibition room, and there are plans to restore the chapel.

Filming location 
Fountains Hall was the location used for the outdoor shots of Baddesley Clinton for the 1603 raid in the first episode of the 2017 BBC One miniseries Gunpowder about events surrounding the Gunpowder Plot.

Some exterior shots for the 1993 film adaptation of The Secret Garden were filmed here.

References

External links 

Fountains Abbey & Studley Royal Water Garden information at the National Trust

Country houses in North Yorkshire
National Trust properties in North Yorkshire
Grade I listed houses
Grade I listed buildings in North Yorkshire
Houses completed in 1604
Historic house museums in North Yorkshire
1604 establishments in England